A Yatagan is a Turkish sword.

Yatagan also may refer to:
T-84 Yatagan, a Ukrainian tank
 Turkish towns:
Yatağan, Muğla
Yatağan, Denizli,  in Serinhisar district
Yatağan Plateau in Denizli Province, Turkey
Yatağan power station, a coal-fired power station in Yatağan, Turkey
Yatagan, Bashkirian musical instrument
Yatagan, a 2020 Bulgarian film

People 
 Mehmet Ali Yatağan (born 1993), Turkish basketball player
 Sergen Yatağan (born 1999), Turkish footballer

Disambiguation pages with surname-holder lists